Tachys is a genus of ground beetles in the family Carabidae. There are at least 270 described species in Tachys.

See also
 List of Tachys species

References

External links

 

Trechinae